Mudigonda is a town and revenue-divisional headquarters in Khammam District of Andhra Pradesh, India.

Mudigonda is one of the Indian surnames.
 Mudigonda Gayathri is a Swedish actress.
 Mudigonda Lingamurthy, famous comedy actor of Telugu cinema.
 Mudigonda Veerabhadra Murthy, Modern Telugu poet.